Metropoliteno (trans. Subway, Underground, Metro) is a partly autobiographical novel written in Esperanto by Vladimir Varankin about suppression by the state in Germany and the Soviet Union.  It was published in Amsterdam in 1933 (200 pages), again in Denmark in 1977, and a third edition in Russia in 1992.  There also exist translations in Russian and in English.  It is listed in William Auld's Basic Esperanto reading List.

"The theme is a soviet engineer, who travels to Berlin to study construction methods for subways (underground electrical railways) ... Modern life in the Soviet Union is mirrored beside that of pre-Hitlerite Germany." (F. E. W., The British Esperantist, November 1934.)

Footnotes

External links 
 Downloadable copy of the Esperanto text

References

The first version of this article is a translation of the entry on Metropoliteno in the Esperanto Vikipedio.  The first version of that entry was taken from the Encyclopedia of Esperanto.

Esperanto novels
1933 novels
Novels by Vladimir Varankin